This is a list of career statistics of Valentino Rossi.

Junior career

Karting

Summary

Minibike

Summary

Italian Sport Production Championship

By season

Races by year
(key) (Races in bold indicate pole position, races in italics indicate fastest lap)

International Junior Championship

By season

Grand Prix motorcycle racing

By season

By class

Races by year
(key) (Races in bold indicate pole position, races in italics indicate fastest lap)

Suzuka 8 Hours results

Records
As of the conclusion of round 18 in Valencia of the 2021 season, Valentino Rossi holds the following records:

Motocross

Summary

Car racing records

Career summary

† Guest driver ineligible to score points.
* Season still in progress.

Monza Rally Show
Rossi participated in the Monza Rally Show championship using Ford Fiesta RS WRC car and won the title 7 times (2006–2007, 2012, 2015–2018) and became the holder of the most titles in this event.

Summary

Complete WRC results
(key)

Complete Blancpain Endurance Series results
(key)

Complete Gulf 12 Hours

GT World Challenge Europe

In 2022, Rossi return to the track to compete in car racing in the GT World Challenge Europe, joining Belgian outfit Team WRT. Rossi, who called time on an illustrious motorcycling career spanning more than two decades in 2021, had previously spoken of a desire to move into car racing, and underwent a test with Team WRT in Ricardo Tormo Circuit, Valencia in December. Rossi will drive an Audi R8 LMS in the endurance and sprint categories, and will sport the number 46, the same number he raced with in MotoGP.

Complete GT World Challenge Europe Endurance Cup results

(key) (Races in bold indicate pole position) (Races in italics indicate fastest lap)

Complete GT World Challenge Europe Sprint Cup results

(key) (Races in bold indicate pole position) (Races in italics indicate fastest lap)

Complete 24H GT Series results

Complete Intercontinental GT Challenge results

Notes

References

Valentino Rossi
Rossi, Valentino